= Christine McDannell =

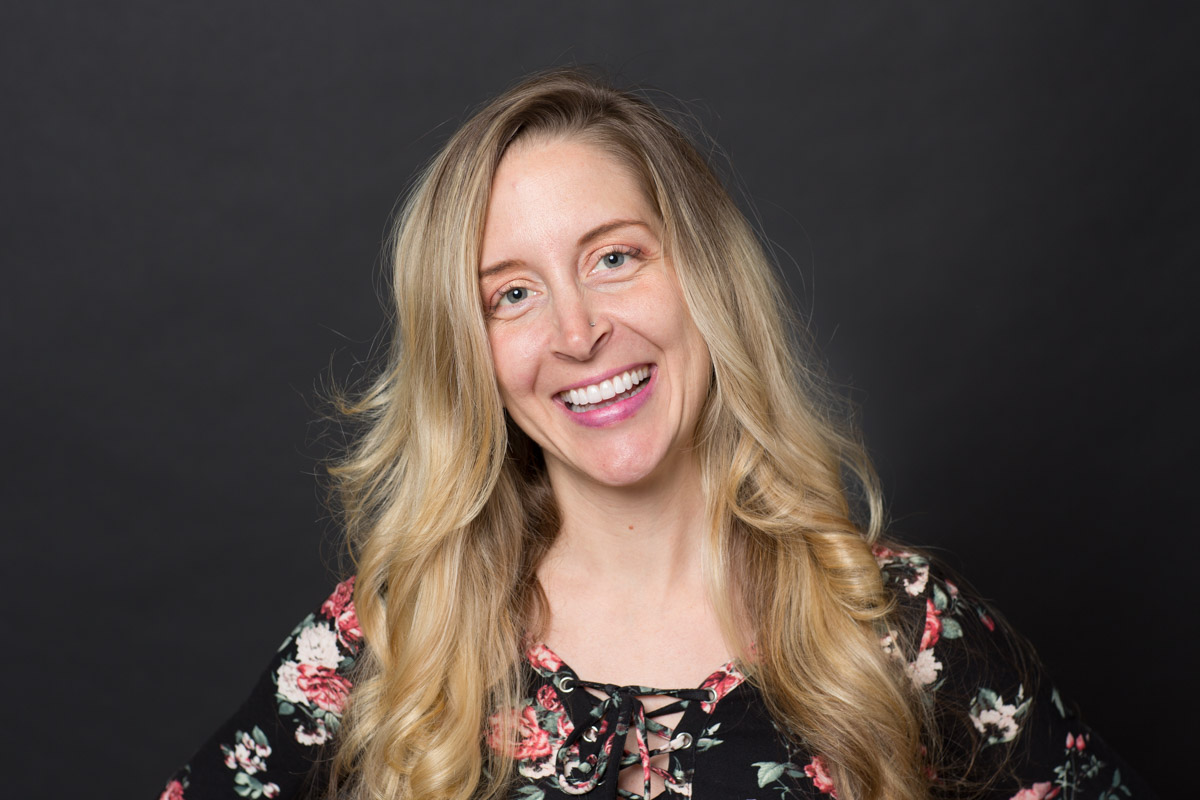
Christine McDannell in December 2018

Christine McDannell is an entrepreneur and principal business intermediary at The Magnolia Firm. After several exits of her own, Christine now assists other companies in her signature process at The Magnolia Firm, her specialized consultancy firm that facilitates business sales & acquisitions. Some of Christine's notable past businesses include Cleanology, Social Starfish, Eco Chateau Spa, Kndrd Inc., Kindred Quarters, and Luxe Car Collective.

She published a book in 2018, for which Richard Branson wrote the foreword. McDannell is also recognized for her contributions to Branson's Virgin Unite Foundation.
